Dmitriy Chvykov (born October 14, 1974 in Frunze, Kirghiz SSR) is a retired Kazakhstani-Kyrgyzstani ski jumper. He holds the Kyrgyz national record of 123 metres. He competed for the Bishkek Ski Club, and was the only Kyrgyz ski jumper on his level.

Chvykov competed in the Winter Olympics 1998 in Nagano and the Winter Olympics 2002 in Salt Lake City. In Nagano he was 30th on the normal hill and 49th on the large hill. In Salt Lake City he was 41st on the normal hill and 39th on the large hill. He also competed in the World Championships 2001 in Lahti, and was 31st on the normal hill. His best World Cup result is 31st place, at  Engelberg in 2001. Chvykov retired after the 2002 Olympics.

References

External links
 

Living people
Kyrgyzstani male ski jumpers
Kazakhstani male ski jumpers
Olympic ski jumpers of Kazakhstan
Olympic ski jumpers of Kyrgyzstan
Ski jumpers at the 1998 Winter Olympics
Ski jumpers at the 2002 Winter Olympics
1974 births
Sportspeople from Bishkek
Sportspeople from Almaty
Kazakhstani people of Russian descent
Kyrgyzstani people of Russian descent
Ski jumpers at the 1996 Asian Winter Games
Ski jumpers at the 2003 Asian Winter Games